Katarina Sofie "Kattis" Ahlström (born 9 June 1966) is a Swedish journalist and television presenter. She is a sister of Gabriella Ahlström.

She hosted the Eurovision Song Contest 2000 together with Anders Lundin, in the Stockholm Globe Arena, and announced the Swedish results in the Eurovision Song Contest 2003. From 28 July 2006, she has been employed at the Sveriges Radio P1 channel.

See also
List of Eurovision Song Contest presenters

References

External links

1966 births
Living people
21st-century Swedish journalists
People from Gothenburg